Topaz is a silicate mineral of aluminium and fluorine with the chemical formula AlSiO(F,OH). It is used as a gemstone in jewelry and other adornments. Common topaz in its natural state is colorless, though trace element impurities can make it pale blue or golden brown to yellow orange. Topaz is often treated with heat or radiation to make it a deep blue, reddish-orange, pale green, pink, or purple.

Although it is often associated with golden yellow and blue, it comes in a variety of colors, including colorless. The rarest are natural pinks, reds, and delicate golden oranges, sometimes with pink hues.

Topaz is a nesosilicate mineral. It is one of the hardest naturally occurring minerals and has a relatively low index of refraction. It occurs in many places in the world.

Etymology
The name "topaz" is usually believed to be derived (via Old French: Topace and Latin: Topazus) from the Greek Τοπάζιος (Topázios) or Τοπάζιον (Topázion), from Τοπαζος. This is the ancient name of St. John's Island in the Red Sea which was difficult to find and from which a yellow stone (now believed to be chrysolite: yellowish olivine) was mined in ancient times. The name topaz was first applied to the mineral now known by that name in 1737. Ancient Sri Lanka (Tamraparni) exported native oriental topazes to Greece and ancient Egypt, which led to the etymologically related names of the island by Alexander Polyhistor (Topazius) and the early Egyptians (Topapwene) – "land of the Topaz". Pliny said that Topazos is a legendary island in the Red Sea and the mineral "topaz" was first mined there. Alternatively, the word topaz may be related to the Sanskrit word तपस् "tapas", meaning "heat" or "fire".

History
Nicols, the author of one of the first systematic treatises on minerals and gemstones, dedicated two chapters to the topic in 1652. In the Middle Ages, the name topaz was used to refer to any yellow gemstone, but in modern times it denotes only the silicate described above.

Many English translations of the Bible, including the King James Version, mention topaz. However, because these translations as topaz all derive from the Septuagint translation topazi[os], which referred to a yellow stone that was not topaz, but probably chrysolite (chrysoberyl or peridot), topaz is likely not meant here.

An English superstition also held that topaz cured lunacy. The ancient Romans believed that topaz provided protection from danger while traveling. During the Middle Ages, it was believed that attaching the topaz to the left arm protected the owner from any curse and warded off the evil eye. It was also believed that wearing topaz increased body heat, which would enable people to relieve a cold or fever. In Europe during the Middle Ages, topaz was believed to enhance mental powers.

Gemstone
Topaz is a gemstone. In cut and polished form, it is used to make jewellery or other adornments. It also has other uses. Orange topaz, also known as precious topaz, is the conventional birthstone for November, the symbol of friendship and the state gemstone of the U.S. state of Utah. Blue topaz is the state gemstone of the US state of Texas.

Characteristics

Topaz in its natural state is colorless, often with a greyish cast. It also occurs as a golden brown to yellow which makes it sometimes confused with citrine, a less valuable gemstone. The specific gravity of all shades of topaz, however, means that it is considerably heavier than citrine (about 25% per volume) and this difference in weight can be used to distinguish two stones of equal volume.  Also, if the volume of a given stone can be determined, its weight if topaz can be established and then checked with a sensitive scale.  Likewise, glass stones are also much lighter than equally sized topaz.

A variety of impurities and treatments may make topaz wine red, pale gray, reddish-orange, pale green, or pink (rare), and opaque to translucent/transparent. The pink and red varieties come from chromium replacing aluminium in its crystalline structure.

Imperial topaz is yellow, pink (rare, if natural) or pink-orange. Brazilian imperial topaz can often have a bright yellow to deep golden brown hue, sometimes even violet. Many brown or pale topazes are treated to make them bright yellow, gold, pink, or violet colored. Some imperial topaz stones can fade on exposure to sunlight for an extended period of time. Naturally occurring blue topaz is quite rare. Typically, colorless, gray, or pale yellow and blue material is heat treated and irradiated to produce a more desired darker blue. Mystic topaz is colorless topaz which has been artificially coated via a vapor deposition process giving it a rainbow effect on its surface.

Although very hard, topaz must be treated with greater care than some other minerals of similar hardness (such as corundum) because of a weakness of atomic bonding of the stone's molecules along one or another axial plane (whereas diamonds, for example, are composed of carbon atoms bonded to each other with equal strength along all of its planes). This gives topaz a tendency to break along such a cleavage plane if struck with sufficient force.

Topaz has a relatively low index of refraction for a gemstone, and so stones with large facets or tables do not sparkle as readily as stones cut from minerals with higher refractive indices, though quality colorless topaz sparkles and shows more "life" than similarly cut quartz. When given a typical "brilliant" cut, topaz may either show a sparkling table facet surrounded by dead-looking crown facets or a ring of sparkling crown facets with a dull well-like table.  It also takes an exceptionally fine polish, and can sometimes be distinguished from citrine by its slippery feel alone (quartz cannot be polished to this level of smoothness).

Another method of distinguishing topaz from quartz is by placing the unset stone in a solution of bromoform or methylene iodide.  Quartz will invariably float in these solutions, whereas topaz will sink.

Localities and occurrence

Topaz is commonly associated with silicic igneous rocks of the granite and rhyolite type. It typically crystallizes in granitic pegmatites or in vapor cavities in rhyolite lava flows including those at Topaz Mountain in western Utah and Chivinar in South America. It can be found with fluorite and cassiterite in various areas including the Ural and Ilmensky Mountains of Russia, in Afghanistan, Sri Lanka, Czech Republic, Germany, Norway, Pakistan, Italy, Sweden, Japan, Brazil, Mexico; Flinders Island, Australia; Nigeria and the United States.

Brazil is one of the largest producers of topaz, some clear topaz crystals from Brazilian pegmatites can reach boulder size and weigh hundreds of pounds. The American Golden Topaz, a more recent gem, weighed a massive . Large, vivid blue topaz specimens from the St. Anns mine in Zimbabwe were found in the late 1980s. Colorless and light-blue varieties of topaz are found in Precambrian granite in Mason County, Texas within the Llano Uplift. There is no commercial mining of topaz in that area. It is possible to synthesize topaz.

See also

 Agate
 Beryl
 Opal

References

External links

 Topaz from the International Colored Gemstone Association 
 Topaz and other minerals found at Topaz Mountain, Juab County, Utah Geological Survey
 

Aluminium minerals
Gemstones
Nesosilicates
Orthorhombic minerals
Minerals in space group 62
Luminescent minerals